Jack Be Nimble is a nursery rhyme.

Jack Be Nimble may also refer to:
 Jack Be Nimble (film),a 1993 horror movie 
 Jack B. Nimble – A Mother Goose Fantasy, a 1957 album by Bing Crosby 
 Jack-be-Nimble, a character from Babes in Toyland

See also
 Jack (hero)